Georg Erich Põld (also Jüri Põld; born 29 July 1952, in Kingissepa) is an Estonian politician. He was a member of the VII and VIII Riigikogu.

References

Living people
1952 births
Estonian Reform Party politicians
Members of the Riigikogu, 1992–1995
Members of the Riigikogu, 1995–1999
Voters of the Estonian restoration of Independence
Recipients of the Order of the National Coat of Arms, 3rd Class
Recipients of the Order of the National Coat of Arms, 5th Class
Tallinn University of Technology alumni
People from Kuressaare